was a town located in Nima District, Shimane Prefecture, Japan.

As of 2003, the town had an estimated population of 4,829 and a density of 152.86 persons per km2. The total area was 31.59 km2.

On October 1, 2005, Nima, along with the town of Yunotsu (also from Nima District), was merged into the expanded city of Ōda.

Dissolved municipalities of Shimane Prefecture